Pinsent is a surname. Notable people with the surname include:

 Cecil Pinsent (5 May 1884 – 5 December 1963), British garden designer and architect
 David Pinsent (1891 – May 1918), friend and collaborator of the Austrian philosopher Ludwig Wittgenstein
 Ed Pinsent (born 1960), English cartoonist, artist and writer
 Dame Ellen Pinsent DBE (1866–1949), British mental health worker
 Gordon Pinsent, CC, FRSC (1930–2023), Canadian television, theatre and film actor
 Hester Pinsent, DBE  (1899–1966), British mental health worker
 John Pinsent (1922–1995), English classical scholar
 Leah Pinsent (born 1968), Canadian television and film actress
 Sir Matthew Pinsent, CBE  (born 1970), English rowing champion, Olympic gold medallist, and broadcaster
 Robert John Pinsent (1797–1876), magistrate and politician
 Zack Pinsent (born  1994), British costumer

See also 
 Pinsent's Arm, Newfoundland and Labrador
 The Pinsent Baronets of Selly Hill in the City of Birmingham, a title in the Baronetage of the United Kingdom
 Pinsent Masons LLP, a commercial law firm
 Pinsent's Paper, informal name of an academic journal
 Redgrave Pinsent Rowing Lake, a rowing lake in the United Kingdom